Sande Avis (The Sande Gazette) is a local Norwegian newspaper published in the municipality of Sande in Vestfold county. 

The newspaper's history goes back to 1981, although it was not until 1993 that it became a weekly subscription publication. In 1999, Sande Avis was purchased by Drammens Tidende. The paper is edited by Hege Frostad Dahle.

Circulation
According to the Norwegian Audit Bureau of Circulations and National Association of Local Newspapers, Sande Avis has had the following annual circulation:
 2006: 2,342
 2007: 2,308
 2008: 2,220
 2009: 2,217
 2010: 2,246
 2011: 2,212
 2012: 2,281
 2013: 2,346
 2014: 2,252
 2015: 2,127
 2016: 2,122

References

External links
Sande Avis homepage

Newspapers published in Norway
Norwegian-language newspapers
Sande, Vestfold
Mass media in Vestfold
Publications established in 1981
1981 establishments in Norway